Dartford railway station serves the town of Dartford in Kent, England. Train services from the station are operated by Southeastern and Thameslink. Southeastern also manages the station. Dartford is a major interchange station in the North Kent region of the Southeastern network. Ticket barriers control access to the platforms.

Dartford Railway Station has become the busiest station in Kent with an annual passenger usage of 4.62 million in 2018/19. Between 2018 and 2019, use of the station increased by 11%, a much higher rate than other stations across Kent. More people use Dartford railway station than Ebbsfleet International and all the other stations in the Borough put together.

The station is where three lines from London meet:
 the North Kent Line, via Woolwich Arsenal
 the Bexleyheath Line
 the Dartford Loop Line via Sidcup.

Westbound services normally terminate at London Charing Cross, London Cannon Street (both via London Bridge), London Victoria and, for Thameslink trains, Luton and Bedford. Services from London also continue through Dartford to Greenhithe (for Bluewater) to terminate at Gravesend, Strood, Rochester or Gillingham. Thameslink trains terminate at Rainham.

Many of the terminating services at Dartford form London bound services, but the remainder will be stabled and maintained at Slade Green Depot approximately two miles west on the North Kent Line. There are several sidings to the east of the station where terminating trains can be stabled until such time as needed to return to Dartford to form London bound services or until drivers are available to return the train to Slade Green Depot.

History 
The first station was opened here by the South Eastern Railway it extended its North Kent Line from Gravesend on 30 July 1849, taking the line from there to London. The original station building had an Italianate design; this was replaced by a glass and metal ticket office complex in 1972. A footbridge leads across the line to the two island platforms.

Replacement of the 1972 station building was approved in 2011, with enabling works started late that year, and major works commenced in mid-2012. The new building was completed in November 2013.

Future development

In the future, Dartford station may form part of a Crossrail extension line, linking to Canary Wharf, London Paddington station, Heathrow Airport and Reading.

Trivia
In 1961, Mick Jagger and Keith Richards met by chance at the station, going on to be the core writing team of the Rolling Stones. There is a plaque on the London-bound platform to commemorate this fact.

Dartford railway station gained a lot of attention due to the high numbers of people travelling using this line, mistakenly not knowing that Oyster cards were not valid, and there was evidence of being approached by staff and receiving penalty fares. In September 2015 Transport for London extended the London fare zones to add Dartford to zone 8, thus allowing Oyster and Contactless payment methods to be used there.

Services

The typical off-peak service in trains per hour is:
 2 tph to London Cannon Street via  and Lewisham 
 2 tph to  via 
 2 tph to  via Woolwich Arsenal and 
 2 tph to  via 

During the peak hours, the station is served by an additional half-hourly service to London Charing Cross via Bexleyheath. The station is also served by a single peak hour service to and from London Blackfriars via Sidcup.

Connections
The station is served by the following bus services:
 Arriva Kent Thameside routes 414, 477, 480 and 490. These buses provide connections to Orpington, Swanley, South Darenth, Bluewater and Gravesend.
 Fastrack routes A, AZ and B. These buses provide connections to Temple Hill, Bluewater, Ebbsfleet and Gravesend.
 Go-Coach routes 429, Dart 1 and Dart 2. These buses provide connections to Temple Hill, Swanley and West Kingsdown.
 London Buses routes 96, 428 and 492. These buses provide connections to Bluewater, Bexleyheath, Erith, Woolwich and Sidcup.

Concessionary and electronic ticketing

Oyster and contactless bank cards
 
Dartford entered the TfL zonal Oyster/contactless system on Sunday 6 September 2015, in Zone 8. Whilst season tickets, daily capping and contactless weekly capping are set at standard Zone 8 levels, single fares from Dartford are lower than "standard" Zone 8 fares.

This followed Southeastern agreement to seek to bring Oyster/Contactless PAYG to Dartford by 31 January 2016 as part of the 2014–2018 franchise extension.

Passenger representation

Dartford Rail Travellers' Association campaigns for improvements across the seven railway stations in the Dartford area - Dartford, Stone Crossing, Greenhithe for Bluewater, Swanscombe, Ebbsfleet International, Longfield and Farningham Road. The group operates through social media on Facebook and Twitter.

References

External links 

Photograph of station building

Transport in the Borough of Dartford
Railway stations in Kent
DfT Category C1 stations
Former South Eastern Railway (UK) stations
Railway stations in Great Britain opened in 1849
Railway stations served by Southeastern
1849 establishments in England
Dartford
Railway stations served by Govia Thameslink Railway